Chahar Burjak District is a district of Nimruz Province in Afghanistan. At just under  in area, it is the largest district in Afghanistan. The Kamal Khan Dam is located in this district.

The population of Chahar Burjak was reported in 2004 at approximately 8,080 people, consisting of Baloch (98%), Pashtuns (1%) and Tajiks (1%). Most natives of the district are farmers and herders.

Notable people
 Abdul Karim Brahui, former Governor of Nimroz Province

See also
Districts of Afghanistan

References

External links
Name of the Province: Nimroz (Islamic Republic of Afghanistan)

Districts of Nimruz Province